This is a list of palaces and mansions in Baranya County in Hungary.

List of palaces and mansions in Baranya County

See also
 List of palaces and mansions in Hungary
 List of castles in Hungary

Literature
 Zsolt Virág : Magyar Kastélylexikon - Baranya megye kastélyai, 2006

References

Baranya County
Houses in Hungary